WildHorse is the debut studio album by American country music artist RaeLynn. It was released on March 24, 2017, via Warner Bros. Nashville. The lead single from the album, "Love Triangle", has reached the Top 30 on the Billboard Country Airplay chart.

Content
RaeLynn co-wrote eleven of the album's twelve tracks. It also features guest appearances from Leeland Mooring (on "Young") and Dan + Shay (on "Say").

Commercial performance
The album debuted atop the Hot Country Albums chart with 20,000 album-equivalent units, 16,000 of those being pure sales. It also debuted at No. 20 on the Billboard 200. The album has sold 47,200 copies in the US as of March 2018.

Track listing

Charts

References

2017 debut albums
Warner Records albums
RaeLynn albums